Greatest Hits is the first compilation album by R&B singer, Joe. It is the last album released on Jive Records.

Track listing

Charts

Weekly charts

Certifications

References

2008 greatest hits albums
Joe (singer) albums
Albums produced by Tim & Bob
Jive Records compilation albums